This is a list of the number-one hits of 1976 on Italian Hit Parade Singles Chart.

Number-one artists

See also
1976 in music

References

1976 in Italian music
Italy
1976